William Burke-White is an American law professor and policy advisor. He was the Inaugural Director of Perry World House, an interdisciplinary global policy research institute at the University of Pennsylvania.

Education
He graduated from Harvard in 1998 with an A.B. in Russian and American History and Literature and obtained a M.Phil. in international relations at Cambridge in 1999. Burke-White earned a J.D. at the Harvard Law School in 2002 and returned to Cambridge as a Fulbright Scholar where he completed his Ph.D. in international relations in 2006.

Career
From 2003–05 he taught at Princeton University and served as special assistant to Anne-Marie Slaughter. In 2005, Burke-White became an Assistant Professor at the University of Pennsylvania Law School. From 2009–11 he was on leave to serve as a member of the Secretary’s Policy Planning Staff at the U.S. Department of State. He is the principal drafter of the Quadrennial Diplomacy and Development Review. In 2010 he was promoted to full Professor and from 2011-2013 he served as Deputy Dean of Penn Law. He was Visiting Professor of Law at Harvard Law School in 2013.

In 2008 Burke-White won a research fellowship from the Alexander von Humboldt Foundation. He was a Visiting Professor at the Max Planck Institute for Comparative Public Law and International Law.

In May 2014 he was appointed as the Inaugural Perry Professor and Director of Perry World House, the University of Pennsylvania's international affairs institute.

He has written extensively in the fields of international criminal law, international investment law, and human rights. He has served as an expert witness in ICSID litigations for a number of governments, most notably the Republic of Argentina.

References

External links 
 Bio at UPenn 

United States Department of State officials
Max Planck Institute for Comparative Public Law and International Law people
Living people
American lawyers
Harvard Law School alumni
University of Pennsylvania Law School faculty
Year of birth missing (living people)
International criminal law scholars
International law scholars